Captains Cove is a census-designated place in Accomack County, Virginia. Per the 2020 census, the population was 1,544. Known as Captain's Cove Golf & Yacht Club, it is a recreational community located on the west shore of Chincoteague Bay, bordering Maryland to the north. While numerous families with children live here, it's largely a retirement community, with a median age of 51 and the largest age group being 60–64.

Geography
It has an elevation of 20 feet.

Demographics

2020 census

Note: the US Census treats Hispanic/Latino as an ethnic category. This table excludes Latinos from the racial categories and assigns them to a separate category. Hispanics/Latinos can be of any race.

Golf and yacht club
Captain's Cove Golf & Yacht Club is located in Accomack County, Virginia and is a recreational community located on the west shore of Chincoteague Bay, bordering Maryland to the north. Captain's Cove features a 9-hole golf course.

References

External links
 Captain's Cove community website

Census-designated places in Accomack County, Virginia
Census-designated places in Virginia